Kaisa Ruuttila (born 14 October 1983) is a Finnish professional golfer who played on the Ladies European Tour between 2007 and 2013. She won the 2007 South African Ladies Masters and the 2010 Ladies Finnish Open.

Career
Ruuttila played for the National Team and represented Finland at three successive Espirito Santo Trophies. She won the Nordic Championship in 2005 and the Finnish Matchplay Championship in 2006. She finished 9th at the 2005 Ladies Finnish Masters, an LET event.

Ruuttila turned professional in December 2006 after she earned an LET card at Q-School. In her rookie year, she tied for 6th at the Finnair Masters in her native Finland. Her best shot at a win on the LET came at the 2011 Austrian Ladies Open, where she fired seven birdies and one bogey in a second round of 66 to take a one stroke lead into the final round. A disappointing 76 on the final day saw her finish third behind Caroline Hedwall and Caroline Afonso. She later finished tied 4th at the 2011 Lacoste Ladies Open de France, two strokes off the lead, to end the season 54th in the Order of Merit.

In 2010 Ruuttila won 4 of 14 tournaments on the Swedish Golf Tour, including the Ladies Finnish Open, and won the Order of Merit.

In 2012 she sustained a back injury that ended her career in 2013.

Amateur wins (2)
2005 Nordic Championship
2006 Finnish Matchplay Championship
Source:

Professional wins (8)

Sunshine Ladies Tour wins (1)
2007 South African Ladies Masters

Swedish Golf Tour wins (7)

Team appearances
Amateur
Espirito Santo Trophy (representing Finland): 2002, 2004, 2006
European Ladies' Team Championship (representing Finland): 2003, 2005

References

External links

Finnish female golfers
Ladies European Tour golfers
Sportspeople from Tampere
1983 births
Living people